Francesca Bartellini (born 14 December  Milan) is an Italian film director, playwright, screenwriter and actress in theatre and cinema.

Biography 
Francesca Bartellini has a degree in History of Philosophy at Universita Statale in Milan and a Master in Renaissance Philosophy at Ecole des Hautes Etudes in Paris. She studied acting and directing with various teachers but mostly with John Strasberg. She has worked from 1988 as an actress, writer and director in the States and in Europe working also with Valentina Fratti's theatre company in New York [10] and Jane Campion. She started her career working at the Organic Theater Company in Chicago. Her first plays have qualified as finalists in writing competitions at the Steppenwolf Theatre Company in Chicago and at the Cleveland Public Theater.

During long periods of time spent in Africa she has filmed several projects, including two documentaries in South Africa working under commission for Unesco at the Women and culture of peace department. She has also filmed the first pan-African conference on Women [11] and a culture of peace in Zanzibar, Tanzania[14]. She has then continued directing documentaries in Africa and Europe collaborating also with South African photographer Guy Tillim as Dop. Her short film Demetra’s Dream stars the actor Julian Sands.
 
She has been member of the jury in 2012 for the Solinas Documentary Prize [13] in Rome and in 2011 for the Pan-African Festival in Cannes.

She has received in 2014 the Cultural prize ‘Luciano Bonaparte, principe di Canino’ by the Region and Provincia of Lazio. In the same year, in Viterbo at Palazzo dei Papi, she has participated sharing the stage with the actor Giancarlo Giannini at the International Festival QDA with the theatrical project ‘Sermones/Life of the Virgin Mary’[1].
 
Recently she has also started teaching in Paris and Italy acting technique in theatre and movies as well as specific workshops on Shakespeare.

Filmography

Actress 
 The Portrait of a Lady (1996)   Role : Isabel's maid
 The Bible : David (TV) (1997) Role : Woman of Tekoah
 The Nicholas's gift (1998) Role: Nurse
 Chère Marianne (2001) Role: Mme Leo
 Demetra's Dream [2] (2008) Role: Rosa-Ecate

Author/Director
 One Day on the path (1999) 
 Ubuntu: notes on forgiveness [3](2001)
 Yannis et les autres - Voyage musical de Olympos à la Calibre (2005) 
 Ma come il vento muove il mare [4] (2007)
 Demetra's Dream [16](2008) 
 Les laboratoires des crais (2009) 
 Monicelli, Le paien [5] [15](2013)

Theatre
 Prostitutki  (Playwright) [11] 1993, New York
 The Supposed Person [6](Playwright ed Actress) 1999, Paris
 Menippo sulla luna[7] (Co-writer, Director) 2004, Athens
 La Febbre [8] (Co-writer, Director) 2012, Milan
 Sermones [9] (Playwright, Actress) 2017, Milan

Books 
 Shakespeare e Donne , La perdita della sfera del fuoco e la nascita del fuoco d’amore o come la Modernità nasce perdendo la natura, Joker Edizioni, 2010
 Sermones, in AA VV,  Teatro Aperto, Joker edizioni,2012

References 
  Elisabetta Castiglioni Article  
 Demetra's dream on Youtube
 Documentary UBUNTU  su www.film-documentaire.fr
 Ma come il vento muove il mare, documentary about Sandro Penna in rai's archives
 Monicelli Le paien, documentary tvmag10, www.lefigaro.fr
 Articolo del Paris Voice su "The Supposed Person"  
 "Menippo sulla Luna" in Epikolono
  Giulio Casale's interview autore de "La Febbre" 
 Corriere della Sera's article about "Sermones"
  Laura Ciulli's interviews  Francesca Bartellini
 The Miranda Theatre Company Archives 
 where she is amongst the international participants 
 Extract from Cinemaitaliano.info
 Africine.org
 "La tuscia ricorda il regista che la amava" su Viterbopost.it 
 Demetra's Dream at RIFF, Rome Independent Film Festival

Links 
 Production's House www.calibanstudios.it
 Francesca Bartellini su IMDB

Living people
1960 births
Italian film directors
Italian screenwriters
Italian dramatists and playwrights